The Lamdan Prize was an Israeli prize awarded annually, from 1954 to 1983, for literary works for children and youth.

The prize was presented by the Ramat Gan Municipality in conjunction with the Hebrew Writers Association in Israel and was founded in the name of the Israeli poet and author Yitzhak Lamdan, shortly following his death.

Recipients
 Amos Bar
 Nachum Gutman
 Rivka Keren
 Levin Kipnis
 Uriel Ofek
 Dvora Omer
 S. Yizhar
 Natan Yonatan

References

Children's literary awards
Israeli literary awards
Hebrew literary awards
Jewish literary awards
Municipal awards
Ramat Gan
Awards established in 1954
Awards disestablished in 1983
1954 establishments in Israel
1983 disestablishments in Israel